Several melodies appear in more than one Creole music compilations; in each case, the title, spelling, etc., are as found in the earliest compilation in the table below:       

Music of Louisiana
Louisiana Creole culture